Jennifer Chan (born 23 June 1998), is a Hong Kong female singer debuted in 2016 under Amusic, professionally known as JC.

Career 
She had participated in different singing competitions since the age of 15 and was signed to Amusic in 2016. Her debut single "說散就散 It's Been Apart" was the Top 10 Trending YouTube Videos of 2016 in Hong Kong.
In 2016, she performed her debut single on Leon Lai's concert. She was invited to perform "Chengdu" and "It's Been Apart" on HunanTV New Year Concert with Bai Jingting, Bibi Zhou and Yoyo Sham.

On 10 August 2018, She appeared in Sing! China.

Discography

Singles

Chart Performance of singles

References 

1998 births
Living people
21st-century Hong Kong women singers
Chinese Mandopop singers
Hong Kong Mandopop singers